Eilat is a city in Israel.

Eliat may also refer to:

A name of a place, building, or facility
 Eilat Mountains, mountain range in Israel
 The Gulf of Aqaba (or, Gulf of Eilat), an arm of the Red Sea
 Port of Eilat, a port facility on that gulf
 Eilat Airport, an Israeli airport located in the city of Eilat, and named for Arkia Airlines founder Yakov Hozman (Jacob Housman)
 Eilat Light, a lighthouse

People with the given name "Eilat"
 Eilat Mazar (1959–2021), archaeologist

People with the surname "Eilat"
 Yoni Eilat, actor and singer
 Gideon Eilat (1924–2015), Jewish rebel during the Mandate of Palestine
 Eliahu Eilat (1903–1990), Israeli diplomat and President of the Hebrew University of Jerusalem

Other 
 One of several ships in the Israeli navy named INS Eilat
 Eilat stone, a blue-green stone (also known as King Solomon stone) mined in the vicinity of the city of Eilat.